Orbital apex syndrome, is a collection of cranial nerve deficits associated with a mass lesion near the apex of the orbit of the eye. This syndrome is a separate entity from Rochon–Duvigneaud syndrome, which occurs due to a lesion immediately anterior to the orbital apex. Most commonly optic nerve is involved.

Presentation
The most common finding is oculomotor nerve dysfunction leading to ophthalmoplegia. This is often accompanied by ophthalmic nerve dysfunction, leading to hypoesthesia of the upper face. The optic nerve may eventually be involved, with resulting visual loss.

Causes 
Jacod Syndrome is commonly associated with a tumor of the middle cranial fossa (near the apex of the orbit); but it can have several other causes.

Neoplastic causes 
 Head and neck cancer
 Neural tumors
 Hematological cancer

Inflammatory causes 
 Sarcoidosis
 Systemic lupus erythematosus
 Eosinophilic granulomatosis with polyangiitis
 Granulomatosis with polyangiitis
 Giant cell arteritis
 Thyroid disease

Traumatic causes 
 Iatrogenic (following surgery)
 Orbital apex fracture
 Penetrating injury

Vascular causes 
 Carotid aneurysm

Diagnosis
Diagnostic methods vary, and are based on specific possible etiologies; however, an X-ray computed tomography scan of the face (or magnetic resonance imaging, or both) may be helpful.

Treatment

References 
 Bailey, Byron J., and Jonas T. Johnson. Head and neck surgery – Otolaryngology. 4th ed. Philadelphia: Lippincott Wilkins and Williams, 2006, p. 2792.
 .

Neurology
Syndromes